"Mind Your Own Business"  is a 1949 song written and originally performed by Hank Williams.

Background 
"Mind Your Own Business" was recorded on March 2, 1949, at Castle Studio in Nashville. During the same session, Williams also recorded "You're Gonna Change (Or I'm Gonna Leave)", "My Son Calls Another Man Daddy", and "Honky Tonk Blues". He is backed by Dale Potter (fiddle), Don Davis (steel guitar), Zeke Turner (lead guitar), Clyde Baum (mandolin), Jack Shook (rhythm guitar), and probably Ernie Newton (bass).

Content
In the song, the narrator admonishes a local busybody for snooping and gossiping. While the delivery is light and breezy, the song's lyrics were likely inspired by the singer's own tempestuous relationship with wife Audrey Williams and the buzz it created. The opening lines seem to reference this: "If the wife and I are fussin', brother that's our right/'Cause me and that sweet woman's got a licence to fight..." His delivery is measured, laconic, and dry. The day before, Hank had cut several duets with his wife Audrey, who by all accounts had limited singing talent. Introducing it in October 1949, he told his radio audience that it was a "little prophecy in song", and indeed it would prove to be.

The song is similar in tone and structure to Williams' first Billboard hit "Move It on Over", with the singer couching his moral indignation in humor, allowing the subject matter to resonate with the public. "Mind Your Own Business" went to No. 6 on the C&W Best Seller list where it stayed for two weeks.

Hank Williams Jr. version 

In late 1986, Hank Williams Jr. recorded the song along with Reba McEntire, Tom Petty, Reverend Ike, and Willie Nelson. This version was the most successful, going to No. 1 on the country chart for two weeks.

Other versions 

In 1964, Jimmy Dean hit the country charts with his version of the song. His version spent six weeks on the charts and peaked at No. 35.
Ernest Tubb included it on his 1968 LP Ernest Tubb Sings Hank Williams.
In 1971, Steve Goodman recorded it on his debut album.
In 1975, Henry McCullough recorded the song, and used it as the title track of his solo album on Dark Horse Records.
Moe Bandy recorded it for his 1975 LP Here I Am Drunk Again.
Charley Pride recorded it for his 1980 album There's a Little Bit of Hank in Me.
Moe Bandy recorded the song for his 1983 tribute Sings the Songs of Hank Williams.
Taj Mahal recorded the song for his 1997 album Señor Blues.

References

Sources
 

1949 songs
1949 singles
1964 singles
1986 singles
Songs written by Hank Williams
Hank Williams songs
Jimmy Dean songs
Moe Bandy songs
Charley Pride songs
Hank Williams Jr. songs
Warner Records singles
Curb Records singles
Song recordings produced by Fred Rose (songwriter)
Vocal collaborations